James Brian Bonsor  (21 August 192622 February 2011) was a Scottish-born composer and teacher specialising in the recorder.

Life and career
Brian Bonsor was born in Hawick, Roxburghshire on August 21, 1926. Following war service he studied at Moray House in Edinburgh and at Trinity College, London, to become a music teacher. He studied briefly with the recorder player Carl Dolmetsch.

Bonsor spent about 35 years in musical education, teaching in primary and secondary schools, including 17 years at Hawick High School. He taught further education classes and summer courses and later acted as Regional Education Advisor for the Scottish Borders in the 1970s.

He was awarded an MBE in 2002 for services to teaching music, in particular the recorder.  Enjoy the Recorder, written by Bonsor, is used to teach the recorder in schools. His arrangements for recorders include Percy Grainger's Mock Morris (1985), Cats by Andrew Lloyd Webber, and Strauss's Emperor Waltz (1985). Bonsor was a musical director for the Society of Recorder Players from 1957.

Bonsor wrote the piano piece Dreamy, which was featured in Trinity Guildhall's 2012–2014 Grade 6 repertoire. His piece Feelin' Good was included in the ABRSM's 05/06 grade 6 repertoire, the Royal College of Music's grade 7 repertoire and the Australian Music Examinations Board's grade 6 Old Syllabus and Willie Wagglestick's Walkabout for the ABRSM's 07/08 grade 7 repertoire and AMEB's grade 7 Old Syllabus.

Bonsor died in Hawick on 22 February 2011.

List of compositions
Bagatelle
Beguine For Descant, Treble Recorders & Piano 1959
 Second Beguine
Dreamy for Piano
Fiesta
Feelin' Good
 Waltz for Mo
 Serenata
 Simple Samba
Willie Wagglestick's Walkabout
Rumba for Descant + Treble Recorders & Piano
Three into 5 for Recorders and Piano
Tig
 Hoe-down
 Valerie

References

1926 births
2011 deaths
20th-century classical composers
21st-century classical composers
British music educators
British recorder players
Members of the Order of the British Empire
People from Hawick
Scottish classical composers
British male classical composers
20th-century Scottish musicians
20th-century British composers
20th-century British male musicians
21st-century British male musicians
20th-century flautists
21st-century flautists